Phespia gibbosa is a species of beetle in the family Cerambycidae. It was described by Magno in 1992.

References

Rhinotragini
Beetles described in 1992